Migliori is an Italian surname. Notable people with the surname include:

Ambra Migliori, Italian swimmer
Francesco Migliori, Italian painter
Gabriel Migliori, Brazilian composer
Jay Migliori, American saxophonist

See also
 Migliore (surname)

Italian-language surnames